Emanuel Mercado (born 21 April 1997) is an Argentine footballer who plays as a forward for Club Almagro.

Career

As a youth player, Mercado joined the youth academy of Argentine side Newell's but left due to the death of his parents.

In 2020, he signed for Danubio in Uruguay, where he has made 7 league appearances and scored 0 goals.

References

External links
 
 

Living people
1997 births
Sportspeople from Córdoba Province, Argentina
Argentine expatriate footballers
Association football forwards
Argentine footballers
Newell's Old Boys footballers
Club Atlético Independiente footballers
Danubio F.C. players
Club Almagro players
Uruguayan Primera División players
Primera Nacional players
Argentine expatriate sportspeople in Uruguay
Expatriate footballers in Uruguay